The Hundred of Erskine is a hundred in the County of Dalhousie, South Australia. The hundred was established 1876 but contains no townships.

See also
 Dawlish, South Australia
Erskine, South Australia

References

Erskine
1876 establishments in Australia